September Song is a 1963 album by Jimmy Durante, with arrangements by Roy Bargy.

Reception

The album was reviewed by Greg Adams for Allmusic who wrote that "Mixing Durante's utterly unique voice with lush strings and a vocal chorus, September Song is a left-field masterpiece full of wistful and affecting performances. Durante was by no means a technically accomplished vocalist, but he negotiated the sessions with aplomb and created a piece of work very different from, but just as charming as, the comedy that had made him a star".

Track listing
 "September Song" (Kurt Weill, Maxwell Anderson)
 "Look Ahead Little Girl" (Jackie Barnett, Sammy Fain)
 "Count Your Blessings Instead of Sheep" (Irving Berlin)
 "When the Circus Leaves Town" (Barnett, Jimmy Durante)
 "I Believe" (Al Stillman, Ervin Drake, Irvin Graham, Jimmy Shirl)
 "Young at Heart" (Carolyn Leigh, Johnny Richards)
 "Don't Lose Your Sense of Humor" (Barnett, Durante)
 "You'll Never Walk Alone" (Richard Rodgers, Oscar Hammerstein II)
 "One Room Home" (Barnett, Durante)
 "Blue Bird of Happiness" (Edward Heyman, Harry Parr Davies, Sandor Harmati)

Personnel
Jimmy Durante – vocals
Roy Bargy – arranger, conductor
Stan Cornyn – liner notes
Jackie Barnett – producer

Other media
"Young at Heart" was featured in the 1991 film City Slickers and also appears on the soundtrack album.

References

Bibliography

External links
 

1963 albums
Albums arranged by Roy Bargy
Albums conducted by Roy Bargy
Albums produced by Jackie Barnett
Jimmy Durante albums
Warner Records albums